Worry About You may refer to:

 "Worry About You" (Tyler James song)
 "Worry About You" (Ivy song)
 "Worry About You", a song by 2AM Club from album What Did You Think Was Going to Happen?

See also 
 "I Worry About You", also spelled "I Worry 'Bout You", a song written by Norman Mapp